Politics of Paraguay takes place in a framework of a presidential representative democratic republic.

The National Constitution mandates a separation of powers in three branches. Executive power is exercised solely by the President. Legislative power is vested in the two chambers of the National Congress. The Judiciary power is vested on Tribunals and Courts of Civil Law and a nine-member Supreme Court of Justice, all of them independent of the executive and the legislature.

Executive branch

|President
|Mario Abdo Benítez
|Colorado Party
|15 August 2018
|}

The president, popularly elected for a 5-year term, appoints a cabinet. The president nominates the Council of Ministers. The presidential elections of 2008 were won by Fernando Lugo, a Roman Catholic bishop whose ministerial duties have been suspended on his request by the Holy See. It was the first time in 61 years that the Colorado Party lost a presidential election in Paraguay, and only a second time that a leftist will serve as president (first time was in 1936–37) and first time freely elected.

The workplace of the President of Paraguay is the Palacio de los López, in Asunción. The Presidential Residence is Mburuvichá Roga, also in Asunción.

Once presidents leave office, they are granted by the Constitution the speaking-but-non-voting position of Senator for life.

Office of the First Lady
In Paraguay, the post of the First Lady of Paraguay is official.

Legislative branch

The National Congress (Congreso Nacional) has two chambers. The Chamber of Deputies (Cámara de Diputados) has 80 members, elected for a five-year term by proportional representation. The Chamber of Senators (Cámara de Senadores) has 45 members, elected for a five-year term by proportional representation.

Political parties and elections

Latest elections

President

Senate

Chamber of Deputies

Judicial branch

Paraguay's highest court is the Supreme Court of Paraguay.

Administrative divisions
The Constitution of Paraguay states "The law will regulate the various areas in which these officials and employees can provide their services, including the judicial, the diplomatic and consular professions, the areas of scientific and technological research, civil services, military and police. This will not preclude others.
" Each of Paraguay's 17 departments is headed by a popularly elected governor.  Paraguay is divided in 17 departments (departamentos, singular – departamento) and one capital city; Alto Paraguay, Alto Paraná, Amambay, Asunción (city), Boquerón, Caaguazú, Caazapá, Canindeyú, Central, Concepción, Cordillera, Guairá, Itapúa, Misiones, Ñeembucú, Paraguarí, Presidente Hayes, San Pedro.

See also
El Stronato

References

External links
 Chamber of Deputies of Paraguai
 Senate of Paraguay
 Presidency of Paraguay
 Supreme Court of Justice